Crane Wilbur (November 17, 1886 – October 18, 1973) was an American writer, actor and director for stage, radio and screen. He was born in Athens, New York.  Wilbur is best remembered for playing Harry Marvin in The Perils of Pauline. He died in Toluca Lake, California.

He was a prolific writer and director of at least 67 films from the silent era into the sound era, but it was as an actor that he found lasting recognition, particularly playing opposite Pearl White in the iconic serial The Perils of Pauline. He brought to the first motion pictures merry eyes, a great, thick crop of wavy, black hair and an athlete's interest in swimming and horseback riding. Twelve years of stage experience prepared him for his venture into the new art of silent motion pictures.

Life and career
He was born Irwin Wilbur on November 17, 1886, in Athens, New York. His father was a shipbuilder who committed suicide while Crane was a young man. Wilbur was a nephew of actor Tyrone Power, Sr., thereby making him a cousin of Tyrone Power.

In an article in the October 1915 issue of Motion Picture Magazine, Wilbur recalled, "My life hasn't been a path of roses, nor always the straight and narrow road. It has been mostly uphill, rocky climbing, with many a slip and stumble, a few falls and several scars to tell the tale." He added, "I have become what I am and have gained what I have by hard work. My preparatory school was the Academy of Experience, and I was finished in the College of Hard Knocks! I come of a theatrical family – was born at a rehearsal on a one-night stand; so, you see, I had to be an actor – I couldn't help it.”

His first appearance in a movie was in 1910 in The Girl From Arizona. Years later, he remembered the experience: “When my first picture was finished I haunted the picture theaters, trying to see it, and when I finally did see it, oh, what a disappointment! It isn’t always pleasant to see yourself as others see you. But it was a great lesson, that first picture. I did many things in that first one that I did not do in the second. It has always been most pleasant work to me, out in the open most of the time, playing manly, vigorous roles, living a hundred different lives before the camera.”

In seventeen films made between 1910 and 1913, Wilbur established himself as a realistic performer who brought youth, good looks, and strength to his characterizations.

In April 1910, the American Pathé studio formed and began producing films in a remodeled cash register factory at Bound Brook, New Jersey. Paul Panzer was one of its first players. Pearl White, a performer from vaudeville who had some movie experience with the Powers Picture Play Company, joined the fledgling studio. Wilbur identified with these players and became a member of their stock company. When the company planned to make a serial, The Perils of Pauline, in 1914, Wilbur wanted the lead male role that would pair him with Pearl White. He tested for and won the coveted role of Harry in the proposed serial.

In 1916, Wilbur scored a personal hit with a five-reel Mutual Masterpiece film, Vengeance is Mine, a thrilling story about the abolishment of capital punishment.

Vitagraph then hired him for his next assignment, The Heart of Maryland (1921), and on its completion, Crane broke from film work altogether. He dropped out of Hollywood and returned to the stage – his first love – for several years. He wrote a modernization of The Bat, a play by Mary Roberts Rinehart and Avery Hopwood. There just was no work for him as an actor in films, so he took to the road. In 1924 Crane was touring in his own play, The Monster, a mystery tale that made The Bat look like a bedtime story. He was notable for his 1926 success in New York on Broadway in The Bride of the Lamb with Alice Brady, and later in 1930 in On the Spot with Anna May Wong.

Wilbur returned to Hollywood in 1929 to resume his acting, writing and directing career with many fictional and documentary films. In 1934, he appeared as an actor in three films: Name the Woman, High School Girl and Tomorrow’s Children, and also directed the last two. As an actor, he played his last on-screen part in Jungle Queen (1945).

Wilbur's work on radio included Big Town, for which he was director and producer.

His work as a writer and director continued for the next 20 years. His outstanding successes, many of which are still shown today, include the screenplay for House of Wax (1953). In 1959, Allied Artists made another version of Mary Roberts Rinehart's play The Bat, starring Vincent Price and Agnes Moorehead and directed by Wilbur. Crane's modernization had been an enormous success for many years, grossing upwards of $9,000,000. The story of eerie happenings in a creepy mansion rented for the summer by a writer of mystery novels had been perennially exciting for audiences, and kept him comfortably funded with royalties for years. Other films followed, including Solomon and Sheba (1959), Mysterious Island (1961), and House of Women (1962).

Crane suffered a stroke and died on October 18, 1973, in Toluca Lake, California.

Partial filmography

As actor

 Through Fire and Air (1913)
 The Perils of Pauline (1914, Serial) - Harry Marvin
 The Road o'Strife (1915, Serial) - Robert Dane
 The Mirror (1915, Short) - The Mountaineer
 Vengeance Is Mine (1916) - John Loring
 A Law Unto Himself (1916) - Allan Dwight / Jean Belleau
 The Love Liar (1916) - David McCare
 The Conscience of John David (1916) - John David
 The Wasted Years (1916) - Old Weatherby / Harry Weatherby
 The Painted Lie (1917) - Lieutenant David Graton
 The Single Code (1917) - Hugh Carrington
 The Eye of Envy (1917) - Ambition, the Blacksmith
 The Blood of His Fathers (1917) - Morgan Gray / Abel Gray
 Unto the End (1917) - Jim O'Neill
 The Finger of Justice (1918) - Noel Delaney
 Breezy Jim (1919) - Breezy Jim
 Devil McCare (1919) - Devil McCare
 Stripped for a Million (1919) - Stanley Warren
 Something Different (1920) - Don Luis Vargas
 The Heart of Maryland (1921) - Alan Kendrick
 It's a Great Life (1929) - Minor Role (uncredited)
 Name the Woman (1934) - Blake
 Tomorrow's Children (1934) - Father O'Brien (uncredited)
 Public Opinion (1935) - Paul Arnold
 Captain Calamity (1936) - Dr. Kelkey
 Yellow Cargo (1936) - Montie Brace
 High School Girl (1937) - Carl Bryson (final film role)

As director and/or writer

 The Monster (1925) (play)
 Lord Byron of Broadway (1930) (dialogue continuity)
 Children of Pleasure (1930) (playwright and dialogue)
 Tomorrow's Children (1934) (director and screenwriter)
 The People's Enemy (1935) (director)
 The Unwelcome Stranger (1935) (co-screenwriter)
 The Devil on Horseback (1936) (director)
 Captain Calamity (1936) (screenwriter)
 Yellow Cargo (1936) (director and screenwriter, also wrote original story)
 We're in the Legion Now! (1936) (director, additional dialogue)
 Dance Charlie Dance (1937) (screenwriter)
 Alcatraz Island (1937) (screenwriter)
 West of Shanghai (1937) (screenwriter)
 The Man Without a Country (1937) (director)
 Over the Wall (1938) (screenwriter)
 The Patient in Room 18 (1838) (co-director)
 Crime School (1938) (screenwriter)
 Penrod's Double Trouble (1938) (screenwriter)
 Girls on Probation (1938) (screenwriter)
 Declaration of Independence (1938 short) (director)
 Swingtime in the Movies (1938 short) (director and screenwriter)
 Blackwell's Island (1939) (screenwriter, also co-wrote story)
 Hell's Kitchen (1939) (screenwriter)
 The Man Who Dared (1939) (director)
 I Won't Play (1944 short) (director)
 I Am an American (1944 short) (director and writer)
 The Devil on Wheels (1947) (director and screenwriter)
 Adventures of Casanova (1948) (screenwriter)
 Canon City (1948) (director)
 The Amazing Mr. X (1948) (screenwriter)
 He Walked by Night (1948) (screenwriter)
 The Story of Molly X (1949) (director and screenwriter)
 Outside the Wall (1950) (director and screenwriter)
 I Was a Communist for the FBI (1951) (screenwriter)
 Inside the Walls of Folsom Prison (1951) (director and screenwriter)
 The Lion and the Horse (1952) (screenwriter)
 The Miracle of Our Lady of Fatima (1952) (screenwriter)
 House of Wax (1953) (screenwriter)
 Crime Wave (1954) (screenwriter)
 The Phenix City Story (1955) (screenwriter)
 The Bat (1959) (director and screenwriter)
 Solomon and Sheba (1959) (story)
 Mysterious Island (1961) (screenwriter)
 House of Women (1962) (writer and uncredited director)

References

Bibliography
 The First Male Stars: Men of the Silent Era by David W. Menefee. Albany: Bear Manor Media, 2007.
 Chats With the Players – Mr. Crane Wilbur, of the Pathé Frères Company. Motion Picture Story. New York: Harry E. Wolff, Publisher, Inc., 1914.
 Crane Wilbur, Mutual Star. The Newark Advocate, November 18, 1916, page 8.
 Classics of the Silent Screen. By Joe Franklin. New York: Cadillac Publishing Company, 1959.
 My Life. By Crane Wilbur in Motion Picture Magazine. New York: M. P. Publishing Company, October 1915.
 The Reminiscences of Crane Wilbur. The New York Times Oral History Program No. 25.  Beverly Hills: American Film Institute, 1977.

External links

 
 

1886 births
1973 deaths
American male film actors
Film directors from New York (state)
American male screenwriters
Burials at Forest Lawn Memorial Park (Hollywood Hills)
20th-century American male actors
American male dramatists and playwrights
20th-century American dramatists and playwrights
20th-century American male writers
Screenwriters from New York (state)
20th-century American screenwriters